Cambodge, entre guerre et paix (Cambodia: Between War and Peace) is a 1991 French-Cambodian documentary film directed by Rithy Panh.

The film, shot at the end of 1991 at the time of Norodom Sihanouk's return to Cambodia, questions the Cambodian people and explores the horrors and effects of the Khmer Rouge on them and what future they may look forward to.

References

External links

1991 films
French documentary films
Cambodian documentary films
Khmer-language films
Films directed by Rithy Panh
1991 documentary films
Documentary films about the Cambodian genocide
1990s French films